José Luis Álvarez y Álvarez (born 4 April 1930) is a Spanish politician.  He was the city of Madrid's mayor from March 3, 1978 and to January 5, 1979. He then worked with Adolfo Suárez and Leopoldo Calvo Sotelo as Minister of Transport and Communications from 1980 to 1981. He also was the Minister of Agriculture, Fisheries and Food between 1981 and 1982. He was born in Madrid.

References

1930 births
Living people
Mayors of Madrid
Agriculture ministers of Spain
Transport ministers of Spain
20th-century Spanish politicians
Fisheries ministers of Spain